USS Racine has been the name of two ships of the United States Navy. Both ships are named for the city of Racine, Wisconsin.

, a  patrol frigate, which served from 1945 until 1946.
, a tank landing ship which served from 1971 until 1993.

United States Navy ship names